The 2021–22 RFU Championship Cup was the third season of the annual rugby union Championship Cup competition for second tier, professional English clubs playing in the RFU Championship. The competition returned after a 14-month hiatus, following the cancellation of the previous year's tournament and the mid season cancellation of the 2019–20 tournament.

Competition format
The competition format is two-legged knockout ties with a first round of five matches, followed by quarter-finals, semi-finals and final. The Championship winners, Ealing Trailfinders received a bye to the quarter-finals. The first round matches took place on 9 April, following the final round of Championship fixtures. In the competition's inaugural season, the RFU had set out the pool matches in a regional format to encourage derby games, but this year's competition format is more loosely structured.

Participating teams and locations

First round

First leg

Second leg

Jersey Reds win 111 – 21 on aggregate 
 
 Doncaster Knights win 56 – 46 on aggregate 

 Hartpury University win 96 – 66 on aggregate

 Coventry win 52 – 49 on aggregate

 Bedford Blues win 90 – 33 on aggregate

Knock-out stage
The four overall winners from round 1 along with the best two losing teams and Ealing Trailfinders will contest the two-legged quarter-finals. The competition will then be played in a single-leg straight knockout format.

Quarter-finals

1st Leg

2nd Leg

 Jersey Reds won 49 - 34 on aggregate

 Cornish Pirates won 71 – 69 on aggregate

 Ealing Trailfinders won 87 – 45 on aggregate

 Coventry won 62 – 53 on aggregate

Semi-finals

Final

See also
 RFU Championship
 British and Irish Cup

References

External links
 RFU

RFU Championship Cup
2021–22 rugby union tournaments for clubs
2021–22 RFU Championship